Peter Hendrick Vrooman (born March 1, 1966) is an American diplomat who has served as the United States ambassador to Mozambique since 2022. He previously served as the United States ambassador to Rwanda from 2018 to 2022.

Education
Vrooman received a Bachelor of Arts degree in Social Studies from Harvard College. He received his Master of Science degree from the Dwight D. Eisenhower School for National Security and Resource Strategy.

Career
Vrooman is a career member of the Senior Foreign Service, with the rank of minister-counselor serving since 1991. He previously served as the U.S. ambassador to Rwanda. Vrooman also served as the Chargé d’Affaires and deputy chief of mission of the U.S. embassy in Addis Ababa, Ethiopia. Other assignments include the spokesperson for the U.S. embassy in New Delhi; director for Iraq on the staff of the White House National Security Council in Washington, D.C.; and deputy political counselor in Tel Aviv and at the U.S. Mission to the United Nations. U.S. embassy assignments include Baghdad, Beirut, and Djibouti, as well as the U.S. Liaison Office in Mogadishu, Somalia. Vrooman was a watch officer in the Department of State Operations Center and the desk officer for Algeria in the Bureau of Near Eastern Affairs. Prior to joining the Foreign Service, he worked as the special assistant to the President of the American University in Cairo.

United States Ambassador to Rwanda
On October 30, 2017, President Donald Trump nominated Vrooman to be the next United States ambassador to Rwanda. Hearings on his nomination were held before the Senate Foreign Relations Committee on December 19, 2017. The committee reported his nomination favorably on February 7, 2018. On February 15, 2018, the Senate confirmed his nomination by voice vote. Vrooman's mission ended around January 24, 2022.

United States Ambassador to Mozambique
On July 27, 2021, President Joe Biden nominated Vrooman to be the next United States ambassador to Mozambique. His nomination was sent to the Senate the following day. The Senate Foreign Relations Committee held hearings on his nomination on October 20, 2021. The committee reported his nomination favorably on November 3, 2021. The entire Senate confirmed his nomination on December 18, 2021 by voice vote. He was sworn into office on February 11, 2022. He presented his credentials to President of Mozambique Filipe Nyusi on March 3, 2022.

Personal life
Vrooman is a native of New York. He is married to Johnette Iris Stubbs, a photographer, and they have a son and a daughter. He speaks Arabic and French.

See also

Ambassadors of the United States
List of ambassadors appointed by Donald Trump

References 

1966 births
Living people
21st-century American diplomats
Ambassadors of the United States to Mozambique
Ambassadors of the United States to Rwanda
Harvard College alumni
United States Foreign Service personnel